Voluntary manslaughter is the killing of a human being in which the offender acted during the heat of passion, under circumstances that would cause a reasonable person to become emotionally or mentally disturbed to the point that they cannot reasonably control their emotions. Voluntary manslaughter is one of two main types of manslaughter, the other being involuntary manslaughter.

Provocation 

Provocation consists of the reasons for which one person kills another. "Adequate" or "reasonable" provocation is what makes the difference between voluntary manslaughter and murder. Provocation is said to be adequate if it would cause a reasonable person to lose self-control.

State of mind

Intent to kill
Voluntary manslaughter requires the same intent as murder. The charge of murder is reduced to manslaughter when the defendant's culpability for the crime is "negated" or mitigated by adequate provocation.

Imperfect self-defense 
In some jurisdictions, malice can also be negated by imperfect self-defense, the principle that an honest but unreasonable belief that it is necessary to defend oneself from imminent peril to life or great bodily injury negates malice aforethought, the mental element necessary  for a murder charge, so that the chargeable offense is reduced to manslaughter. Self-defense is considered imperfect when extenuating circumstances exist that are insufficient to constitute a complete legal defense to homicide, but nonetheless partially excuse the act that resulted in death.

United States

Model Penal Code
The United States' Model Penal Code (MPC) does not use the common law language of voluntary and involuntary manslaughter. Under the MPC, a homicide that would otherwise be murder is reduced to manslaughter when committed "under the influence of extreme mental or emotional disturbance for which there is a reasonable explanation or excuse". Several court decisions in various jurisdictions have interpreted this language broadly by creating a subjective standard to determine whether the provocation was adequate from the defendant's point of view. This subjective standard diverges substantially from the common law reasonable person test and allows the jury greater latitude.

For example, in State v. Dumlao, the court interpreted the MPC language broadly, holding that reasonableness should be evaluated from the defendant's perspective. The subjective standard for whether a provocation was reasonable, and thus adequate, would allow a jury to consider Dumlao's "mental abnormalities", including a medical diagnosis of "paranoid personality disorder".

Case law

References 

Killings by type